Adenor Leonardo Bacchi (born 25 May 1961), commonly known as Tite, is a Brazilian professional football coach and former player who was the head coach of the Brazil national team from 2016 to 2022.

Tite played from 1978 to 1984 for Caxias, then a season for Esportivo de Bento Gonçalves and a season for Portuguesa. The three following seasons from 1986 to 1989 at Guarani were his most successful as player. At age 27, he ended his career due to successive knee injuries that caused him to lose mobility in one of his knees.

From 1991 onwards, Tite coached more than 10 teams in more than 15 stints. Amongst these were his first club, Caxias that he returned to in 1999, and they won the 2000 Campeonato Gaúcho defeating Grêmio, which had Ronaldinho in its team. Due to the achievements with Caxias, Tite became the Grêmio coach in 2001 where they won the 2001 Campeonato Gaúcho and the 2001 Copa do Brasil. He stayed until 2003 when Tite trained other teams: São Caetano, Corinthians in 2004, Atlético Mineiro in 2005, Palmeiras in 2006, and Al Ain of the United Arab Emirates in 2007. From 2008 to 2009 he trained Internacional and they won the 2008 Copa Sudamericana and the 2009 Campeonato Gaúcho. At the end of 2010 he was announced as a coach of Al Wahda of the United Arab Emirates, but he left the club months later to return to Corinthians.

For Corinthians, Tite won the 2011 Campeonato Brasileiro Série A title, the 2012 Copa Libertadores title, the 2012 FIFA Club World Cup title against Chelsea, the 2013 Campeonato Paulista and the 2013 Recopa Sudamericana. On 14 November 2013, Tite announced that he was leaving the club. After a sabbatical period, Tite returned to Corinthians in 2015, where they won the 2015 Campeonato Brasileiro Série A.

Club career
Tite began his playing career in 1978 for Caxias. In 1984 he played for Esportivo de Bento Gonçalves. In 1985 he played for Portuguesa. From 1986 until 1988 he played for Guarani, in which he achieved the greatest honors as a player in his career, being part of the squad that finished as runners-up in the 1986 Campeonato Brasileiro Série A, the 1987 Copa União and the 1988 São Paulo State Championship. His career, however, was ended prematurely at age 27 due to successive knee injuries, which caused him to lose mobility in one of the knees.

Coaching career

Early career
Midway through the 1990 Segundona, Guarany's manager Celso Freitas left the club, and Tite was appointed manager on his place. In 1991, after narrowly missing out promotion with Guarany, he was named in charge of Caxias, but left the club in 1992.

Tite joined Veranópolis in 1992, shortly after leaving Caxias, and led the side to a title in the 1993 Campeonato Gaúcho Segunda Divisão. On 3 January 1996, he was presented as manager of Ypiranga de Erechim, but was dismissed on 22 April after eleven matches.

Tite was in charge of Juventude for a brief period during the 1997 season, but was sacked during the year's Campeonato Gaúcho and replaced by Gílson Nunes. In 1998, he had short stints at Caxias and Veranópolis, and also worked as a sports commentator in the Rádio Gaúcha.

Early success

Caxias
In 1999, Tite was hired by Caxias, his first club as a professional footballer, leading the team through a surprising campaign in the 2000 Campeonato Gaúcho. Caxias were the champions of the Rio Grande do Sul state tournament, defeating Ronaldinho's Grêmio, winning the first match at the finals by 3–0 and drawing the second one with no goals. Tite's success on the Gauchão drew the attention of the Rio Grande do Sul press, as the Campeonato Gaúcho is rarely claimed by any team other than the "big two", Grêmio and Internacional.

Grêmio
Signed by Grêmio in 2001, Tite led the Porto Alegre squad to another Gauchão title, defeating Juventude in the finals, winning by 3–2 and 3–1 and claiming the 2001 Campeonato Gaúcho for Grêmio.

In the same year, Grêmio won the 2001 Copa do Brasil under Tite's command, knocking out a respectable selection of teams throughout the brackets, such as Villa Nova on the first stage, Santa Cruz on the second, Fluminense on the round of 16, São Paulo on the quarter-finals, and Coritiba on the semifinals. Facing Corinthians on the finals, Tite's Grêmio drew the first leg of the finals at their home stadium, Estádio Olímpico Monumental, by 2–2. In front of a capacity crowd at Estádio do Morumbi, Grêmio defeated Marcelinho Carioca and Müller's Corinthians 3–1, claiming what would be Tite's first national title.

Tite would remain with the Tricolor Gaúcho until 2003, leaving the club after failing to lead the club to any substantial victory after the 2001 Copa do Brasil. Grêmio reached the third place at both the 2002 Campeonato Brasileiro Série A and the 2002 Copa Libertadores, but led Grêmio to a lackluster campaign during the year of 2003, which led to his departure from the club, exacerbated by his long spell as coach.

Leaving Rio Grande do Sul; Spells in São Paulo, Minas Gerais, and foreign clubs
Tite was hired by São Caetano do Sul club Associação Desportiva São Caetano in 2003, with the goal of taking the azulão to the Copa Libertadores qualifying zone. Leading the team to a good campaign, São Caetano reached the fourth place in the league table, qualifying itself to the 2004 Copa Libertadores, being routed at the quarter-finals by Boca Juniors, after drawing both games and losing on penalty kicks. Tite, however, had been fired by the club and replaced with Muricy Ramalho before the 2004 Campeonato Paulista.

Tite also coached Corinthians (2004–2005), Atlético Mineiro (2005), Palmeiras (2006), and Al Ain (2007).

Internacional
Tite was signed in 2008 to Internacional, despite the protests of the colorado supporters, who resented the presence of the former coach of their rivals, Grêmio, as the club manager.

Since then, Tite led the club to a sixth-place finish in the 2008 Campeonato Brasileiro Série A, and won the 2008 Copa Sudamericana over Argentine club Estudiantes de La Plata, eliminating important Latin American clubs such as Universidad Católica, Boca Juniors and Chivas Guadalajara along the way.

Under Tite's command, Internacional also won the 2009 Campeonato Gaúcho over Grêmio and reached the 2009 Copa do Brasil finals, losing against Corinthians but knocking clubs such as Flamengo and Coritiba out of the competition. Internacional were the runners-up of the 2009 Recopa Sudamericana, losing against LDU Quito in the finals. In the same year, Internacional won the 2009 Suruga Bank Championship, defeating Japanese club Oita Trinita.

In the 2009 season, Internacional had a very good first half of the season, however its results greatly diminished during the second half, both in and out of the Beira-Rio stadium. Tite was then fired by the directors of the club on 5 October.

Brief stay at Al-Wahda and return to Corinthians
Tite was signed by Emirati side Al Wahda. Tite's stay was brief, as he was approached by his former club, Corinthians, to replace coach Adilson Batista, who had left the team.

Campeonato Brasileiro 2010
Tite returned to Corinthians in a complicated moment, as the club's battle for the 2010 Campeonato Brasileiro Série A title had been derailed by a 10-game dry spell, which caused the sacking of previous coach Adilson Batista with eight matches still to be played in the season. In spite of not winning the tournament, losing the title at the final round of the season after a draw against Goiás from Goiânia, Corinthians had a solid campaign under Tite, remaining unbeaten through the final matches of the season, and finishing at a respectable third place, earning a berth at the 2011 Copa Libertadores first stage and cementing Tite's position.

Defeat in the Libertadores Cup
After an uneventful debut at the 2011 Campeonato Paulista, defeating Portuguesa 2–0, the Corinthians squad prepared itself for its matches against Deportes Tolima for the preliminary stage of the Copa Libertadores. Drawing 0–0 at the Estádio do Pacaembu, Tite's squad raised suspicions with the fans and the press, as the preliminary stage of the continental competition was widely seen in Brazil as a preamble to the real competition, not being a proper part of it. With the moral obligation of winning the away leg of the match in Estadio Manuel Murillo Toro at Ibagué, Colombia, Corinthians was under intense scrutiny of their supporters and detractors. Playing poorly against the Colombian squad, barely finishing or generating goal scoring opportunities, Tolima defeated Corinthians 2–0, inciting fury among supporters, the mockery of rival fans, and a crisis in the São Paulo team, as Corinthians was the first Brazilian team not to advance in the "Pré-Libertadores", as the preliminary stage of the cup is known. Despite the wide demand of the fans to fire him, club president Andrés Sánchez reinforced the fact that Tite was still the coach.

Days later, 1994 and 2002 FIFA World Cup champion, all-time lead scorer at World Cup finals and two-time Ballon d'Or winner Ronaldo was criticized for his poor performance, physical shape and lack of playing time for Corinthians throughout his spell with the team, announced his retirement from the sport. Fellow 2002 world cup champion Roberto Carlos departed the club for Russian club Anzhi Makhachkala alongside Jucilei, while Bruno César left for Benfica. The team, already without Elias and soon to be without Dentinho, who would leave the club for Shakhtar Donetsk, needed an overhaul. Tite enlisted the help of Portuguese international – and native Brazilian – Liédson, who returned to Brazil to join Corinthians.

2011 Campeonato Paulista
Soon after its Libertadores defeat, Corinthians had to face their rivals, Palmeiras, on the Campeonato Paulista. With Tite's job on the line, Corinthians won the derby by 1 goal to 0. Picking up important victories on the competition, Corinthians had qualified to the final stage of the Paulistão, defeating Oeste in the quarter-finals, Palmeiras in the semi-finals, and drawing against Santos on the first leg of the finals. Santos, however, won 2–1 in the second leg of the final match, winning their second state title in a row.

2011 Campeonato Brasileiro
Off to an impressive start on the Brasileirão with a ten-game undefeated streak, Corinthians spent most of the first half of the 2011 season as the leader of the competition, in spite of moments of instability, such as its defeats against Avaí and rivals Palmeiras, coupled with draws against lower table clubs such as Ceará.
 
With a diminished performance during the second half of the season, Tite's job as a coach was being questioned by the fans, after repeated losses and a two-loss streak against Fluminense and Santos. The club president, Andrés Sanchez, did not budge and kept backing Tite's status as manager. Facing São Paulo in a derby match, Tite decided to remove club captain, the defender Chicão from the starting 11. The match ended in a goalless draw, quelling the demands of the fans and helping maintain Tite's managing position. Earning important, but sometimes lackluster, results, including a 0–0 draw against direct competitors for the title Vasco da Gama, Tite's Corinthians went on undefeated until the 29th round, when it lost to Botafogo. In the 33rd round, Corinthians lost against América-MG, in a great upset. América, virtually relegated and firmly entrenched on the last place of the league, played at home, but decided to sell all of their game tickets to the opposing fans to improve finances, as América's matches typically had very low fan attendance. In front of a capacity crowd of corintianos, América defeated Corinthians 2–1, finally improving its condition on the league table. With five games to go until the end of the season, the demands for Tite's departure were mounting, and were once again quelled by a winning streak.

In the penultimate match of the competition, Corinthians needed a win against Figueirense and it needed Vasco da Gama to draw against Fluminense in order to become champions of the 2011 season. Routing the Florianópolis team with ease, Coringão was virtually the champion, as Vasco drew against Fluminense during the Rio de Janeiro derby. In the final minute of the match, however, Vasco scored, interrupting the celebrations of the São Paulo club, pushing the championship definition to the next and final round, on the coming Sunday.

Leading the league tables by the final round, Corinthians had 70 points and a higher win ratio, while Vasco had 68 points. Needing only a draw against bitter rivals Palmeiras to be consecrated as champions, Corinthians was in a better position than Vasco, who needed to defeat Flamengo and for Corinthians to lose against Palmeiras. Vasco did not manage to defeat Rio rivals Flamengo, and Corinthians drew against Palmeiras in a tense game, winning the Campeonato Brasileiro. This was Tite's first Campeonato Brasileiro title, and his second national title.

Tite was praised by the press for his persistence and his important tactical changes during the matches, and for promoting two important overhauls in the club, the first after the Libertadores defeat, and the second after the Paulistão finals loss.

2012 Copa Libertadores
After a turbulent elimination in the 2012 Campeonato Paulista, in which Corinthians were eliminated in the playoffs by Ponte Preta, Tite managed the club to their first ever Libertadores title in an unbeaten campaign, defeating Boca Juniors in the finals.

2012 FIFA Club World Cup

Entering the 2012 FIFA Club World Cup as the reigning South American champions, Corinthians earned a berth in the semi-finals against Egyptian club Al Ahly, the reigning 2012 CAF Champions League champions. Edging the Africans 1–0, Tite's defensive, possession-based tactics were called into question, especially after the tense second half of the game which saw the Egyptians create many goalscoring chances.

Advancing to the final, Corinthians were to face the champions of Europe, Chelsea. The two teams were in deeply different stages of morale and form – Chelsea interim manager Rafael Benítez was being heavily contested by the supporters; the captain of the team, John Terry, was out due to injury; and the team's main striker, 2010 World Cup winner Fernando Torres, was in poor form. Tite's squad lacked individual quality and talent, but was fine-tuned tactically and enjoyed a heavy boost of morale. The match saw the young goalkeeper Cássio save many dangerous shots, and Corinthians won after striker Paolo Guerrero scored a header against Petr Čech, winning Corinthians its second World Club Cup title, as well as Tite's first.

2013 and leaving Corinthians
Despite winning State of São Paulo League and Recopa Sudamericana, 2013 was not a good year for Corinthians. The club was eliminated in Copa Libertadores, where they unsuccessfully tried to defend their title, had a poor campaign at the Brazilian League and also lost Brazilian Cup after a penalty was missed by Alexandre Pato, arguably the main signing of that season.

Although supported by most Corinthians fans, Tite announced that his contract with the club would not be renewed on 14 November. Mano Menezes (former Brazil national team head coach and Corithians president Mario Gobbi's friend) return as Alvinegros coach.

Sabbatical year
After leaving Corinthians, Tite decided to focus on studying modern football. He received offers, but declined them in favour of his studies. He watched several games (including games from the 2014 World Cup) and visited some clubs as part of that refinement, including Arsenal and Carlo Ancelotti's Real Madrid. He was expected to be appointed as Brazil's new coach and was even approached by Japan, but Dunga was selected as Brazil's coach and Tite did not go through negotiations with Japan.

Third stint at Corinthians
On 15 December 2014, Tite's return as manager of Corinthians was announced. He won the 2015 Campeonato Brasileiro Série A with the best campaign in the history of the tournament at time, only being surpassed by Flamengo in 2019.

Brazil national team

In June 2016, Tite was announced as the new coach for the Brazil national team to replace Dunga, who was fired following Brazil's poor performance at Copa América Centenario. In Tite's first match in charge of Brazil, a 2018 World Cup qualifying match against Ecuador on 1 September 2016, Brazil prevailed 3–0, with goals from Neymar and Gabriel Jesus. He would then lead his team to seven consecutive victories in qualifying matches, eventually securing a spot at the World Cup in Russia, making them the first team to qualify for the tournament, apart from the hosts. On 14 May 2018, Tite announced the 23-men Brazil squad for the 2018 FIFA World Cup. He would lead the squad to a quarterfinal exit.

Tite is noted for not having a preferred captain - as of May 2018, he had named 15 different captains in 19 matches. As of May 2019, he had used a total of 16 in 21 matches, with Neymar being the most common one with a total of seven matches. In August 2018, Tite decided to have Neymar as the fixed captain as an opportunity for him to demonstrate maturity following his behavior at the 2018 FIFA World Cup. In May 2019, however, he handed the armband to Dani Alves following Neymar's incident with a spectator at the 2019 Coup de France final.

On 25 July 2018, Brazil manager Tite signed a new contract which keeps him with the five-time world champions until the end of the 2022 World Cup.

In 2019, Tite led the Brazil national team to win the 2019 Copa América on home soil; this was Brazil's 9th Copa America title, their first Copa America in 12 years, and their first trophy in 6 years.

In February 2022, Tite revealed that he intended to step down as manager of Brazil after the 2022 FIFA World Cup. On 9 December 2022, Tite confirmed that he would leave Brazil, following their elimination from the quarter-finals of the World Cup against Croatia on penalties.

Managerial statistics

Honours
ManagerVeranópolis Campeonato Gaúcho – Segunda Divisão: 1993Caxias Campeonato Gaúcho: 2000Grêmio Campeonato Gaúcho: 2001
 Copa do Brasil: 2001Internacional Copa Sudamericana: 2008
 Campeonato Gaúcho: 2009
 Suruga Bank Championship: 2009Corinthians Campeonato Brasileiro Série A: 2011, 2015
 Copa Libertadores de America: 2012
 FIFA Club World Cup: 2012
 Campeonato Paulista: 2013
 Recopa Sudamericana: 2013Brazil Superclásico de las Américas: 2018
 Copa América: 2019Individual'
Campeonato Brasileiro Série A Coach of the Year: 2015

Personal life
Tite is married to Rosmari and has a daughter and son Mateus Bachi, who played NCAA Division II soccer at Carson–Newman University. Tite is a practising Roman Catholic.

As a youth, he studied physical education under Luiz Felipe Scolari at school. Like Scolari, Bacchi family immigrated from Italy. Scolari went on to be his mentor and then rival as a coach. He went on to graduate in physical education at the Pontifícia Universidade Católica de Campinas.

See also
 List of Brazil national football team managers

References

External links

 

1961 births
Living people
People from Caxias do Sul
Brazilian Roman Catholics
Brazilian people of Italian descent
Brazilian footballers
Brazilian football managers
Brazilian expatriate sportspeople in the United Arab Emirates
Association football midfielders
Campeonato Brasileiro Série A managers
Campeonato Brasileiro Série A players
Sociedade Esportiva e Recreativa Caxias do Sul players
Clube Esportivo Bento Gonçalves players
Guarani FC players
Associação Portuguesa de Desportos players
Sociedade Esportiva e Recreativa Caxias do Sul managers
Esporte Clube Juventude managers
Grêmio Foot-Ball Porto Alegrense managers
Associação Desportiva São Caetano managers
Sport Club Corinthians Paulista managers
Clube Atlético Mineiro managers
Sociedade Esportiva Palmeiras managers
Al Ain FC managers
Sport Club Internacional managers
Brazil national football team managers
Al Wahda FC managers
Veranópolis Esporte Clube Recreativo e Cultural managers
2018 FIFA World Cup managers
2019 Copa América managers
2021 Copa América managers
UAE Pro League managers
Sportspeople from Rio Grande do Sul
2022 FIFA World Cup managers